Dipu is the main town and the seat of Anji County, in northwest Zhejiang province, China. There are 48 villages and 12 communities within its area. Zhejiang Provincial Highway 4 runs through the town.

It is within a 3-hour drive of many other cities in the Yangtze River Delta, including Ningbo, Suzhou and Nanjing. The name of the town origins from "Post" because the town was a mail post in ancient China. There is a Post Plaza on the bank of the town's main river.

References

Township-level divisions of Zhejiang